Herman Eugene Howard (March 10, 1910 – December 30, 1969), nicknamed "Red", was an American Negro league pitcher between 1937 and 1946.

A native of Birmingham, Alabama, Howard made his Negro leagues debut in 1937 with the Birmingham Black Barons. He went on to play for several teams, finishing his career in 1946 with the Chicago American Giants. Howard died in Birmingham in 1969 at age 59.

References

External links
 and Seamheads

1910 births
1969 deaths
Atlanta Black Crackers players
Birmingham Black Barons players
Chicago American Giants players
Jacksonville Red Caps players
Memphis Red Sox players
20th-century African-American sportspeople
Baseball pitchers